Magic Labyrinth is a studio album by jazz acoustic bassist Marc Johnson, and the second with his "Right Brain Patrol" trio featuring guitarist Wolfgang Muthspiel and percussionist Arto Tuncboyaciyan. It was released by JMT Productions (JMT 514 018-2) in 1995.

Review 
On this album Johnson show even more exquisite landscapes in improvisational music. Magic Labyrinth brings together individual compositions by the musician, one collaborative work between Johnson, Muthspiel and Tunçboyaciyan, and additional two delicate compositions by Miles Davis and Hermeto Pascoal. Downbeat praised the album for its "excursions to the more adventurous and angular regions of improvisational jazz".

Reception
The Allmusic review by Rick Anderson awarded the album 4 stars.

Track listing

Personnel
Marc Johnson – upright bass
Wolfgang Muthspiel – electric and acoustic guitars, and guitar synthesizer 
Arto Tunçboyaciyan – percussions and vocals

Credits 
Marc Johnson – composer (tracks # 1, 5 & 7)
Arto Tuncboyaciyan – composer (tracks # 2, 6 & 7)
Wolfgang Muthspiel – composer (tracks # 4, 7 & 8)
Miles Davis – composer (track # 3)
Hermeto Pascoal – composer (track # 9)
Carlos Albrecht – engineer
Hiroshi Itsuno – executive producer
Stefan Winter – producer

Notes 
Digitally recorded June 1994 at Skyline Studios, NYC, digitally mixed and mastered Nov. 1994 at Bauer Studios, Ludwigsburg

References 

1995 albums
Marc Johnson (musician) albums
JMT Records albums
Winter & Winter Records albums